Metroliner or Metro Liner may refer to:

Metroliner (train), a former train service between New York and Washington, D.C.
Budd Metroliner, rail coaches and cabs used on the Metroliner service above
Fairchild Swearingen Metroliner, an aircraft
MCW Metroliner, a British bus
NABI 60-BRT, the buses developed for the Metro Liner bus rapid transit system in California

See also

Metro line (disambiguation)

Metrolina (disambiguation)
Liner (disambiguation)
Metro (disambiguation)